The 1891 Grand National was the 53rd renewal of the Grand National horse race that took place at Aintree near Liverpool, England, on 20 March 1891.

Finishing order

Non-finishers

References

 1891
Grand National
Grand National
19th century in Lancashire